is a passenger railway station located in the city of Konan, Shiga Prefecture, Japan, operated by the West Japan Railway Company (JR West).

Lines

Station layout
The station consists of a single side platform serving one bi-directional track, with an elevated station building. The station his attended

Platforms

History
Kōsei Station was opened on October 1, 1981 as a passenger station on the Japan National Railway (JNR). The station became part of the West Japan Railway Company on April 1, 1987 due to the privatization and dissolution of the JNR.

Passenger statistics
In fiscal 2019, the station was used by an average of 2318 passengers daily (boarding passengers only).

Surrounding area
 Konan City Hall East Office
 Konan Municipal Kosai Junior High School
 Konan Central Fire Department

See also
List of railway stations in Japan

References

External links

JR West official home page

Railway stations in Shiga Prefecture
Railway stations in Japan opened in 1981
Konan, Shiga